Louis-Claude Brullé (died 8 January 1772 in Paris) was an 18th-century French printer and Encyclopédiste.
 
From 1752 until 1765, Brullé was a foreman in the printing company of André le Breton, one of the four publishers of the Encyclopédie. Brullé helped his employer to censor this book, which earned him the lasting resentment of Diderot.

Brullé wrote the articles Imprimerie and Prote for the Encyclopédie.

References

External links 
 Franck A. Kafker, « Brullé : l’ostrogoth identifié », Recherches sur Diderot et sur l'Encyclopédie, n° 27
 Imprimerie on Wikisource
 Prote on Wikisource

French printers
Contributors to the Encyclopédie (1751–1772)
1772 deaths